Manoj Kumar Singh is a Nepalese politician who is elected member of Provincial Assembly of Madhesh Province from CPN (Unified Marxist–Leninist). Singh is a resident of Tilathi Koiladi Rural Municipality, Saptari.

References

External links

Living people
Madhesi people
Members of the Provincial Assembly of Madhesh Province
People from Saptari District
Communist Party of Nepal (Unified Marxist–Leninist) politicians
1969 births